Johannes Marthinus (Jan) de Wet (10 November 1927 – 13 February 2011) was a Namibian politician and farmer.

Politics
De Wet entered politics as a member of the South African Parliament from 1964 to 1970. He then became the Commissioner General of Indigenous People (Commissioner of Bantu Affairs) from 1970 to 1978. While working in South Africa, de Wet was amongst officials who met then rebel organization South West Africa People's Organization (SWAPO) in Geneva, Switzerland.

Following the Turnhalle Constitutional Conference in 1978 and the possibility of Namibian independence, the farmer left South African politics and entered White Namibian politics with the Action Christian National. De Wet was a member of the Transitional Government of National Unity from 1985 until independence in 1989. He chaired that body from August 1987 until January 1988. Following the 1989 democratic election, de Wet was selected  to represent the ACN in the Constituent Assembly of Namibia (1989–90) and 1st National Assembly (1990–94).

Farming
A White Namibian, de Wet was a farmer in Leonardville in Namibia's eastern Omaheke Region. As head of the Namibian Agricultural Union from 1994 to 2004, de Wet worked with the Namibian government concerning the country's land reform processes, questioning criteria and methods of redistribution.

References

1927 births
2011 deaths
People from the Free State (province)
Namibian people of South African descent
Stellenbosch University alumni
Members of the National Assembly (Namibia)
People from Omaheke Region
Namibian farmers
White Namibian people
Afrikaner people
Action Christian National politicians